"Purple Haze" is a song by English electronic music duo Groove Armada, taken from their fourth studio album, Lovebox (2002). The song contains elements from "April, Spring, Summers and Wednesdays", performed by English rock band Status Quo. Released on 21 October 2002, "Purple Haze" reached number 36 on the UK Singles Chart and number 38 in Italy.

Personnel
Groove Armada
 Andy Cato – producer, mixing, keyboards, guitar
 Tom Findlay – producer, mixing, keyboards

Additional musicians
 Wallace 'Red Rat' Wilson – vocals
 Nappy Roots – raps
 Keeling Lee – guitar
 Jonathan White – bass
 Clive Jenner – drums
 Patrick Dawes – percussion

Charts

References

2002 singles
2002 songs
Groove Armada songs
Songs written by Andy Cato
Songs written by Bob Young (musician)
Songs written by Francis Rossi